The Counter Misinformation Team or Counter Mis-information Team, headed by Todd Leventhal, was part of the United States Department of State's Bureau of International Information Programs. The team was tasked with responding to alleged misinformation and disinformation about the United States government. It was discontinued after the Bush administration ended.

Creation 
The team was originally formed to counter Soviet misinformation during the Cold War.

Response to 9/11 conspiracy theories
In an attempt to debunk 9/11 conspiracy theories, the team released "The Top September 11 Conspiracy Theories" report on August 28, 2006.

Following organizations 
, the State Department, under the Global Engagement Center, was still attempting to fight misinformation. There are current call for the State Department to continue the fight against misinformation.

References

United States Department of State
Communication of falsehoods